Lloyd Marion Parsons (June 10, 1918 – November 24, 1986) was an American football player. 

A native of Minneapolis, Parsons attended Roosevelt High School in that city.  He played college football as a fullback for Minnesota and then for Gustavus Adolphus in 1940.

He played professional football in the National Football League as a back for the Detroit Lions. He appeared in seven games during the 1941 season.

References

1918 births
1986 deaths
Minnesota Golden Gophers football players
Detroit Lions players
Players of American football from Minneapolis
Roosevelt High School (Minnesota) alumni